Roman Celentano (born September 14, 2000) is an American professional soccer player who plays as a goalkeeper for Major League Soccer club FC Cincinnati.

Early life 
Roman Celentano was born on September 14, 2000 to Marcello and Manuela Celentano. He is from Naperville, Illinois, where he attended Neuqua Valley High School. He has two siblings, named Julian and Remi.

Club career

Youth and college 
Celentano enrolled at Indiana University in 2019 and joined the Indiana Hoosiers men's soccer team. He played for the Hoosiers for three seasons, the first two of which they were Big Ten Conference regular season champions and tournament champions. Celentano was twice named Big Ten Goalkeeper of the Year, was twice named to the Big Ten All-Tournament Team, and was recognized as the Big Ten Defensive Player of the Tournament in 2020.

Professional 
Celentano decided to forgo his senior year of college at Indiana University to sign a Generation Adidas contract with Major League Soccer, making him eligible for the 2022 MLS SuperDraft. Projected as a Top 10 draft pick, Celentano was drafted second overall by FC Cincinnati in the draft, becoming the highest drafted goalkeeper in the SuperDraft since Andre Blake in 2014. As a Generation adidas player, he signed with FC Cincinnati the same day on January 11, 2022.

Celentano went on loan for the early part of the 2022 season with Cincinnati's reserve team, FC Cincinnati 2 in MLS Next Pro, where he made his professional debut on March 27, 2022 in a 0–2 loss to Philadelphia Union II. Celentano made his first team debut for Cincinnati on April 19, 2022 in a U.S. Open Cup match against the Pittsburgh Riverhounds. A few days later, on April 24, 2022, Celentano made his MLS debut, starting and playing the full match in a 1–2 loss to Los Angeles FC.

Celentano bagged his first clean sheet in a victory against Toronto FC on May 4, 2022 and then followed that up with a second consecutive clean sheet against Minnesota United FC. That earned the rookie a spot in the MLS team of the week for Week 10 of the 2022 Major League Soccer season.

International career
In January 2023, Celentano received his first call-up to the United States ahead of friendlies against Serbia and Colombia.

Career statistics

Club

Honors 
Individual
Big Ten Conference Goalkeeper of the Year: 2020, 2021
NCAA Men's Division I Tournament Defensive MOP Award: 2020

References

External links 
 Roman Celentano at MLS Next Pro

2000 births
Living people
Association football goalkeepers
FC Cincinnati draft picks
FC Cincinnati players
FC Cincinnati 2 players
Indiana Hoosiers men's soccer players
Major League Soccer players
MLS Next Pro players
NCAA Division I Men's Soccer Tournament Most Outstanding Player winners
Soccer players from Illinois
Sportspeople from Naperville, Illinois
American soccer players